The 2006–07 Welsh Premier Division or 2006–07 Principality Premiership for sponsorship reasons was the sixteenth Welsh Premier Division. The season began on Saturday 2 September 2006 and ended on Saturday 5 May 2007. Fourteen teams played each other on a home and away basis. This was also the last season where teams earned three points for a win and one point for a draw.

Stadiums

1,500 of them are seats

Table

Results

Matchday 1

Matchday 2

Matchday 3

Matchday 4

Matchday 5

Matchday 6

Matchday 7

Matchday 8

Matchday 9

Matchday 10 (6/7)

Matchday 11 (6/7)

Matchday 12

Matchday 13

Matchday 14

Matchday 15

Matchday 16 (5/7)

Matchday 17 (5/7)

Matchday 18

Matchday 19

Matchday 20 (6/7)

Matchday 11 (7/7)

Matchday 21 (6/7)

Mixed matchdays

Matchday 22 (7/7)

Mixed matchdays

Matchday 24

Matchday 25

Matchday 26 (3/7)

Mixed matchdays

Matchday 16 (6/7)

Mixed matchdays

Matchday 23 (4/7)

Mixed matchdays

Matchday 23 (7/7)

Matchday 26 (7/7)

Welsh Premier Division seasons
2006–07 in Welsh rugby union
Wales